Museum of the Mountain Man is a museum located in Pinedale, Wyoming, US that exhibits western historical pieces relating to the mountain men who explored the region in the early to middle part of the 19th century.  The museum is typically open during the summer months.

External links 
Museum of the Mountain Man

History museums in Wyoming
American West museums in Wyoming
History of the Rocky Mountains
+
Museums in Sublette County, Wyoming